Moses Hedley Toata (born 10 October 1975) is Solomon Islander football manager and former player. He is currently the technical director of the Solomon Islands Football Federation. 
For nearly a year Toata managed the Solomon Islands national team before stepping down in July 2016. As a player, Toata made 10 appearances for the national team and scored one goal as a midfielder. At club level, he played for Kossa for his entire career. He has won the Solomon Islands S-League as both a player and a manager.

Playing career

Club career
Toata made his senior football debut in 1994 playing for Sunbeam FC in the Honiara Premier League while attending Betikama High School. In 1996 he transferred to Naha FC  and moved at the end of the 1997 season for Kossa. Playing primarily as a midfielder and striker, Toata played for Kossa until the 2009–10 season. He was part of the 2006–07 S-League winning squad, Kossa's only S-League win.

International career
Toata's first inclusion in the national team squad was in June 1997 for the second round of OFC qualification for the 1998 FIFA World Cup. He was on the bench in a 13–0 loss to Australia but was not substituted on. On 15 June 1997, Toata made his international football debut. He was substituted on for George Kiriau at half time in a 4–1 win against Tahiti. He then went on to score his first international goal in the 89th minute. Toata went on to make nine more appearances, scoring no goals, for the national team, with his last appearance in 2004.

Managerial career

Solomon Warriors
On 1 July 2012, Toata was appointed manager of Solomon Islands S-League side Solomon Warriors. In his first season in charge, the Solomon Warriors won the S-League. They also competed in the 2012–13 OFC Champions League where they finished third in their group and therefore did not advance to the knockout rounds.

In the following season his team feature in three competitions. The league, the OFC Champions League and the Melanesian Super Cup. In the league Solomon Warriors finished second, one point behind Western United. At the OFC Champions league, the highest level of Oceanian football, Solomon Warriors played three games, winning against Vailima Kiwi FC 8–0, drawing with Waitakere United 1–1 and losing to A.S. Pirae 2–1 and finished third in their group, missing out on the knockout rounds by one place. In the Melanesian Super Cup, Solomon Warriors won the tournament, beating Tafea F.C. and Amicale F.C. in a three-team competition.

In the 2015–16 season, Solomon Warriors won the S League, Totoa's second S-League title as a coach. His team retained their Melanesian Super Cup title, topping the table in a four-team competition. They beat Amicale F.C., Erakor Golden Star and Western United, winning against all three teams.

Solomon Islands
Toata was appointed the manager of the Solomon Islands national team on 16 October 2015, replacing Jacob Moli. Toata's first game in charge was a friendly against Papua New Guinea on 24 March 2016 and the team won 2–1. His team played another friendly against the same team three days later but, this time, they lost 2–1.

Toata's first major international tournament was the 2016 OFC Nations Cup. Solomon Islands were drawn in group B along with New Zealand, Fiji and Vanuatu. In their first match they beat Vanuatu 1–0 with Jerry Donga scoring a goal in the 19th minute. They then lost 1–0 to both New Zealand and Fiji. After all the group B fixtures were completed New Zealand finished top with nine points. Solomon Islands, Fiji and Vanuatu all finished on three points. Solomon Island's goal difference of −1 was better than Fiji's −2 and Vanuatu's −5 so they finished second. This meant they qualified for the semi-finals, where they played the winner of group A, Papua New Guinea, as well as qualifying for the third round of OFC qualifying for the 2018 FIFA World Cup. In the game against Papua New Guinea, Solomon Islands lost 2–1 with an 82nd minute Nigel Dabinyaba goal knocking Toata's team out of the competition.

In July 2016 Toata wanted to step down as head coach of the national team. Before stepping down, he led the Solomon Island into the World Cup Preliminary qualifying round against Tahiti and Papua New Guinea. In November 2019 Toata's Solomon Islands lost 3–0 away to Tahiti but return home to beat Tahiti on home soil by 1 goal to zero only six days later. He was replaced by Spaniard Felipe Vega Arango as interim Coach and Solomon Islands went on to beat PNG to earn a two legged play off with New Zealand losing away and drawing at home.

In 2018 Toata returned on interim base to lead the Solomon Islands in two international friendly matches, beating Macau 1-4 and drew with Fiji 1–1 in Suva. In March 2019 Toata led Solomon Islands to beat Vanuatu 3–1 in an International friendly at home and later on in the same month went on to beat Chinese Taipei 0–1 in Taipei. Toata continued as interim coach until April 2019, when he was named as the Technical Director of the Solomon Islands football Federation. As a head coach he was replaced by Dutch coach Wim Rijsbergen.

Notes
For the 2004 and 2005–06 seasons Kossa F.C. was known as Fairwest F.C.

References

1975 births
Living people
Solomon Islands national football team managers
Solomon Islands football managers
Solomon Islands international footballers
Solomon Islands footballers
Kossa F.C. players
2000 OFC Nations Cup players
2004 OFC Nations Cup players
Association football midfielders